Zarathustra is the Iranian prophet Zoroaster.

Zarathustra may also refer to:
 Zarathustra (album), a 1973 album by the Italian band Museo Rosenbach
 Zarathustra (horse), an Irish-bred Thoroughbred racehorse

See also
 Also sprach Zarathustra (disambiguation)
 Thus Spoke Zarathustra (1880s), a philosophical novel by Friedrich Nietzsche
 Also sprach Zarathustra, a tone poem composed by Richard Strauss
 Also Sprach Zarathustra (painting) (1995–1997), a cycle of paintings by Lena Hades
 Zarathrusta (1991), a computer game for the Amiga